Evelyn Ashenbrucker (born 6 August 1990) is an American rugby union player. She plays at Lock for the United States internationally and for the San Diego Surfers in the WPL.

Ashenbrucker was selected in the Eagles squad for the delayed 2021 Rugby World Cup in New Zealand.

References

External links 

 Evelyn Ashenbrucker at USA Rugby

Living people
1990 births
Female rugby union players
American female rugby union players
United States women's international rugby union players